Muconic acid is a dicarboxylic acid.  There are three isomeric forms designated trans,trans-muconic acid, cis,trans-muconic acid, and cis,cis-muconic acid which differ by the geometry around the double bonds.  Its name is derived from mucic acid.

{| class="toccolours" border="0" style="left"
| align ="center" | 
| align ="center"| 
| align ="center"|
|-
| align ="center" | 
| align ="center"| 
| align ="center"|
|-
| align ="center"|trans,trans
| align ="center"|cis,trans
| align ="center"|cis,cis
|-
|}

trans,trans-Muconic acid is a metabolite of benzene in humans.  The determination of its concentration in urine is therefore used as a biomarker of occupational or environmental exposure to benzene.  Synthetically, trans,trans-muconic acid can be prepared from adipic acid.

cis,cis-Muconic acid is produced by some bacteria by the enzymatic degradation of various aromatic chemical compounds.

The bioproduction of muconic acid is of interest because of its potential use as a platform chemical for the production of several valuable consumer bioplastics including nylon-6,6, polyurethane, and polyethylene terephthalate.

See also
 Dicarboxylic acid
 2-Aminomuconic acid

Notes

Dicarboxylic acids